The Perth Spirit is a former rugby union team based in Perth, Western Australia, that played in the National Rugby Championship (NRC) from 2014 to 2017, winning the competition in 2016. The team was formed in 2007 to compete in the Australian Rugby Championship (ARC).

The Perth Spirit team was organised and managed by RugbyWA. The high performance programs utilised by the Western Force in Super Rugby were extended to players joining the Spirit from the Force, the Perth Premier Grade competition and the Future Force rugby academy.

The identity of the Perth Spirit remained the same throughout team's participation in the ARC and NRC. The team disbanded when the ARC was discontinued after the first season in 2007 but, after an absence of six years, the national competition was relaunched in 2014 as the NRC, and the Perth Spirit was revived. In 2017, however, the Western Force was excluded from the Super Rugby competition. The reformed RugbyWA then decided to enter the Western Force in the National Rugby Championship, replacing the Perth Spirit for the start of the 2018 season.

Colours and logo
The Perth Spirit's main colours were black and gold, the traditional colours of Western Australia. The NRC jerseys also had a splash of blue under the collar to symbolise the pathway to the Western Force team. The team's logo featured a stylised black swan, similar to that of the Western Force although on a gold background instead of the Force's blue. The black swan is the state emblem and state bird of Western Australia.

History
In 2006, after setting up a consultative process culminating in a working session of some 70 delegates from around the country, the Australian Rugby Union announced that a new, eight-team national competition would commence in 2007 to compete for the Australian Rugby Championship (ARC).

Australian Rugby Championship
With the announcement of a new national rugby union competition, it was known that one of the foundation clubs would be located in Perth - with three teams in New South Wales, two in Queensland and one each in Canberra and Melbourne making up the inaugural eight.

The Perth team's name - Spirit, along with colours and logo were unveiled in March 2007. Some 20 names were considered for the ARC team, with Spirit being the option finally preferred because it was seen to be identifiable as Western Australian and a good fit with the Force name used by the Super Rugby team. RugbyWA Chief Executive, Peter O’Meara, said:

At the launch of the new team, it was revealed that John Mulvihill would be the head coach of the Spirit for the inaugural season. Mulvihill was also the Super 14 Western Force attack coach. The team's jersey for the ARC was a traditional design with black and gold hoops.

The ARC competition started in August, with the Spirit playing their first home game on the second weekend of August. The Spirit's home games were played at Members Equity Stadium. At the time, the Western Force did not play at Members Equity but at the larger capacity venue of Subiaco Oval. However, Members Equity Stadium was better suited to rugby due to its rectangular configuration. The stadium had a capacity of around 17,000 in 2007. It has since been expanded to hold over 20,000 and, due to another sponsorship deal, is now known as nib Stadium.

The players in the ARC squad adopted an unconventional name of the "Perth Pigs". The team was captained by half back Matt Henjak after he overcame a back injury. Tai McIsaac was the vice-captain. Perth finished third on the league table after the regular season, and played the Central Coast Rays in a semi-final at Gosford. The Rays won the match 20–8.

The Australian Rugby Championship was terminated at the end of 2007 after only one season of competition, with the Australian Rugby Union citing higher costs than budgeted and further projected financial losses. The Perth Spirit team was disbanded with the end of the ARC competition.

National Rugby Championship

In December 2013, the ARU announced that the national competition was to be relaunched, with the National Rugby Championship (NRC) commencing in 2014. Expressions of interest were open to any interested parties, with the accepted bids finalised in early 2014.

In 2014, it was announced that the Perth Spirit team would be revived to take part in the National Rugby Championship, and that the original logo and black and gold jersey colours would be retained. For the 2014 NRC season, the Spirit secured Western Australian local business the Property Club as the main jersey sponsor on a three-year deal, and non-bank currency specialist AFEX (Associated Foreign Exchange) as shorts sponsor on a two-year deal.
  
Western Force assistant coaches David Wessels and Kevin Foote were named as joint head coaches of the Perth Spirit for the 2014 season. Dwayne Nestor and Elwee Prinsloo were named as assistant coaches. For the Spirit's first match, Rory Walton was named as captain from an on-field leadership group which also included Kyle Godwin, Luke Morahan, Ian Prior, Heath Tessmann, and Sam Wykes.

Dwayne Nestor was appointed head coach in 20I6.

2016 NRC Final

Perth Spirit beat the NSW Country Eagles to win the 2016 NRC Final 20–16 at Scully Park.

Home grounds
Most of the Perth Spirit's home matches were played at the UWA Rugby Club in Mount Claremont. In their earlier seasons matches were also played at other locations across Greater Perth, and a match was also hosted in Adelaide to promote the growth of rugby in South Australia. Venues used in previous seasons include:

Records

Honours
National Rugby Championship
Champions: 2016
Runners-up: 2014
Playoff appearances: 2017
Horan-Little Shield
Season winners: 2017
Australian Rugby Championship
Playoff appearances: 2007

Season standings
National Rugby Championship
{| class="wikitable" style="text-align:center;"
|- border=1 cellpadding=5 cellspacing=0
! style="width:20px;"|Year
! style="width:20px;"|Pos
! style="width:20px;"|Pld
! style="width:20px;"|W
! style="width:20px;"|D
! style="width:20px;"|L
! style="width:20px;"|F
! style="width:20px;"|A
! style="width:25px;"|+/-
! style="width:20px;"|BP
! style="width:20px;"|Pts
! style="width:25em; text-align:left;"|  Play-offs
|-
|2017
|4th
| 8 || 4 || 0 || 4 || 269 || 237 || +32 || 4 || 20
|align=left|  
|-
|2016
|3rd
| 7 || 5 || 0 || 2 || 250 || 210 || +40 || 2 || 22
|align=left|  Grand final win over NSW Country by 20–16
|-
|2015
|6th
| 8 || 3 || 0 || 5 || 276 || 271 ||  +5 || 4 || 16
|align=left|  Did not compete
|-
|2014
|4th
| 8 || 3 || 0 || 5 || 301 || 259 || +42 || 5 || 17
|}

Australian Rugby Championship
{| class="wikitable" style="text-align:center;"
|- border=1 cellpadding=5 cellspacing=0
! style="width:20px;"|Year
! style="width:20px;"|Pos
! style="width:20px;"|Pld
! style="width:20px;"|W
! style="width:20px;"|D
! style="width:20px;"|L
! style="width:20px;"|F
! style="width:20px;"|A
! style="width:25px;"|+/-
! style="width:20px;"|BP
! style="width:20px;"|Pts
! style="width:25em; text-align:left;"|  Play-offs
|-
|2007
|3rd
| 8 || 6 || 0 || 2 || 210 || 138 || 72 || 1 || 25
|align=left|  
|}

Head coaches
 2017: Kevin Foote
 2016: Dwayne Nestor 
 2015: Tai McIsaac
 2014: David Wessels and Kevin Foote
 2007: John Mulvihill

Captains
 2017: Michael Ruru
 2016: Heath Tessmann
 2015: Heath Tessmann, Ian Prior, Angus Cottrell 
 2014: Rory Walton, Sam Wykes, Ian Prior
 2007: Matt Henjak

Squads

The squad for the 2017 National Rugby Championship season:

(c) Denotes team captain, Bold player internationally capped at the time, 1 denotes allocated national player additional to the squad.

The following players were named in the Perth Spirit's extended squad for the 2016 National Rugby Championship:

(c) Denotes team captain, Bold player internationally capped at the time, 1 denotes allocated national player additional to the squad.

The following players were named in the Perth Spirit's extended squad for the 2015 National Rugby Championship:

(c) Denotes team captain, Bold denotes player internationally capped at the time, 1 denotes allocated national player additional to the squad.

The following players were named in the Perth Spirit's extended squad for the 2014 National Rugby Championship:

(c) Team captain; Bold denotes player internationally capped at the time, 1 denotes allocated national player additional to the squad.

(c) Denotes team captain, Bold denotes player internationally capped at the time, 1 denotes allocated national player additional to the squad.

References

External links

Australian Rugby Championship
National Rugby Championship
Sporting clubs in Perth, Western Australia
Rugby clubs established in 2007
2007 establishments in Australia
Western Force
Sports clubs disestablished in 2018
2018 disestablishments in Australia